Billinton is a surname. Notable people with the surname include:

L. B. Billinton (1882–1954), the Locomotive Engineer of the London, Brighton and South Coast Railway from 1912 to 1923
R. J. Billinton (1844–1904), the Locomotive, Carriage, Wagon and Marine Superintendent of the London, Brighton and South Coast Railway from 1890 to 1904
 Roy Billinton

See also
Billington (surname)